The 16th Grey Cup was played on December 1, 1928, before 4,767 fans at the A.A.A. Grounds at Hamilton.

The Hamilton Tigers shut out the Regina Roughriders 30–0.

External links
 
 

Grey Cup
Grey Cups hosted in Hamilton, Ontario
Grey Cup
1928 in Ontario
December 1928 sports events
20th century in Hamilton, Ontario
Saskatchewan Roughriders
December 1928 events in North America